Video & Arcade Top 10 (often abbreviated as V&A Top 10 or simply V&A) was a Canadian game show broadcast on YTV from 1991 to 2006. Filmed in Toronto, Ontario, it was a competitive game show in which contestants played against each other in video games for prizes, with assorted review and profile segments on current games, music, and movies featured as well. V&A Top 10 is one of a select few English language Canadian game shows to run nationally for at least 15 years, joining Front Page Challenge, Reach For The Top, and Definition in that category. Reruns of the series from the late 1990s and 2000s aired on GameTV from November 2011 to September 2012.

The series was hosted by then-YTV PJ Gordon Michael Woolvett (a.k.a. Gord the PJ Man) in its first season, after which he was replaced by then-CFNY radio DJ Nicholas Schimmelpenninck (a.k.a. Nicholas Picholas), who had presented the previous season's music review segments. Picholas served as host for the remainder of V&As run, and would regularly be joined by three other on-air personalities: one serving as a primary co-host alongside him, and two more to present other segments. Past co-hosts have included Lexa Doig, David J. Phillips, and Liza Fromer, among many others, while Leah Windisch was Picholas' final primary co-host.

Gameplay
The main portions of each episode would have four contestants playing one player modes of video games against each other, typically from Nintendo consoles supported at the time of filming. Two separate games on the same console were played on each episode by two different groups of contestants, with the hosts explaining what needs to be done in order to win each round before gameplay began. Scoring was calculated by having the contestants try and either get the highest score, collect the most of something, maintain the most health, or get the best time in their game, depending on the genre, with a tie-breaking method emphasized on the air in case it was needed. For example, in WWE WrestleMania X8 on the Nintendo GameCube. they had to pin the most people, while in Super Mario 64 for the Nintendo 64, they had to collect the most stars. During gameplay, Nicholas & the main co-host would tell the audience about the games' rules, plots, special moves, and sometimes secrets or codes while assorted gameplay footage was shown on screen, though specific coverage of the contestant's progress and scores weren't revealed to the home audience.

Though Nintendo consoles were the most frequently used systems on Video & Arcade Top 10, games for Nintendo's Game Boy handheld systems were also featured occasionally, either being played through the Super Game Boy peripheral on the Super NES, or the Wide-Boy 64 adapter for the Nintendo 64. Later seasons also occasionally featured games on the Sony PlayStation consoles. Likely as they didn't have TV connectivity at the time, games for Nintendo's Virtual Boy and Nintendo DS systems were not played on episodes.

At the end of the round, the winning contestant generally won a copy of the game that they just played, and a second small prize, typically a Timex watch in later seasons. Some seasons featured an additional first-place prize from a show sponsor, like a Toronto Blue Jays prize pack or a KFC Big Crunch meal. By the end of the series' run, first-place winners received a title from the show's "video game library" rather than the game they played on that episode.

Each losing contestant would win a consolation prize of their own. For example, later seasons saw the 2nd-place finisher win dinner passes for the Medieval Times dinner theatre in Toronto, while the third & fourth place contestants each won a Video & Arcade Top 10 T-shirt, or by the last season, an Air Hogs helicopter toy. Each contestant was also paired up with a viewer at home that sent in a postcard & an attendee in the studio audience that would each win the game that their assigned contestant won if they came in first place.

The show was aired abridged, editing out some host bloopers and portions of the show that didn't impact the final results. As a result, contestants had much more time than what was shown to reach their goals in the featured games. At least six shows were shot sequentially, and the same audience was used for three shows in a row, meaning that they would have to be present for several hours during the taping.

Top 10 Bonus Wall
After each round, the winner would then go to the show's bonus round, The Top 10 Bonus Wall, to win another prize. Here, they were blindfolded and (in earlier seasons) spun around three times, after which they would put their hand in a container of 11 balls (10 white, 1 red) with numbers corresponding with the prizes to be won. If the player pulled a white ball, the number on it indicated the prize with the matching number that they won. If they pulled the red ball, then they could choose any prize that they wanted from the bonus wall.

Bonus round prizes included video game peripherals, action figures, playsets, board games, educational prizes, and passes to Toronto-area tourist attractions, among numerous others. These prizes were usually provided by sponsors for the show, and advertisements were common during commercial breaks.

Additional segments
Aside from the main gameplay, a number of segments and contests were featured to profile other new video games and popular media for the home audience or respond to viewer letters, during and after each round. Many of these had an attached contest where viewers could send in a postcard or letter to try and win a prize, with the mailing address for these contests shown frequently on-screen on each episode.V&A Update: One of the secondary co-hosts briefly highlights information, hints, and tips for a recently released video game not otherwise featured on that day's episode, while emphasizing that home viewers should write down the provided tips. This segment took place twice on each episode, profiling a different game for each, though generally from the same console.Music Review: The other secondary co-host briefly profiles a new CD released by a popular musician or band, followed by showing a brief clip from a music video for a single from said album. Afterwards, the co-host plugs a contest where viewers can write in with the answer to a skill-testing question, usually referring to a brief fact from the review. The first person to write in with the correct answer would win a prize, generally a CD or home movie.Movie Review: Same as above, only the co-host profiles a new home video release, while showing a brief clip from the movie. The attached contest ran under similar rules, with the winner generally receiving free movie rental passes, typically from Rogers Video or Jumbo Video in later seasons.Letter Time: Nicholas Picholas reads a letter on-air that was sent in by a home viewer, which typically featured the viewer's name, age, and favourite video games & consoles. If their letter was read on air, the viewer would win a copy of one of the games that a first-place contestant won during that episode. Previous letters read during this segment were displayed on the wall behind Nicholas.Turbo Tips: Nicholas outlines additional tips, tricks, and hints for both games played in-competition on that day's episode. Unlike the V&A Updates, the tips in this segment were provided concurrently rather than in separate portions of the show.V&A Top 3:''' Nicholas' main co-host delivers a list of the top 3 best selling video games at the time of filming (originally the "Top 10" like in the show's title.) A separate contest after this segment allowed home viewers to win a larger prize if they could be the first to write in with the solution to a more difficult code or hint from a game not otherwise featured that week. This section of the show featured the co-host standing beside the cabinet for Rock-Ola's release of the 1980 arcade game Armor Attack.

Theme music
The theme music for Video & Arcade Top 10 was composed by Nicholas Schnier, who also provided original Mega Man music for Clips and Destructo Bros. on the Run, two other game shows that aired on YTV in the 1990s. Some fans have noticed that the V&A Top 10 theme song bears a resemblance to the Crash Man stage theme from the Nintendo Entertainment System game Mega Man 2, released in North America two years before V&A Top 10'''s premiere.

References

External links

VideoandArcade.com (ARCHIVED)

1991 Canadian television series debuts
Canadian children's game shows
Television shows filmed in Toronto
YTV (Canadian TV channel) original programming
2006 Canadian television series endings
Television series by The Robert Essery Organization
1990s Canadian game shows
2000s Canadian game shows
Television series by Corus Entertainment
Television shows about video games
1990s Canadian children's television series
2000s Canadian children's television series